The Circle K/Fiesta Bowl 200 was the final name of a PPG IndyCar World Series race held annually at Phoenix International Raceway in Avondale, Arizona, from 1979 though 1986; it was known as the Miller High Life 150 for five editions during that period. The race was known by multiple other names, operated under other sanctioning bodies, and was run at other distances during a much longer history before IndyCar.

Race history

Open wheel racing in the Phoenix area dates back to 1915 on a dirt oval at the Arizona State Fairgrounds. Earl Cooper, who competed in the Indianapolis 500 seven times, won the inaugural race—scheduled for 150 laps of the one-mile track, it was ended after 109 miles due to darkness.

The race was revived in 1950 by the AAA, and then passed to the United States Auto Club (USAC) in 1956. USAC moved the race to the newly built Phoenix International Raceway in 1964. The race became a CART event in 1979. During the CART years, two races were scheduled through the mid-1980s, but the track dropped down to one race per year starting in 1987.

Starting in 1954, the race was named for driver Bobby Ball, who died in February 1954 following a racing accident in Los Angeles in January 1953. The race was renamed in 1972 due to sponsorship from Best Western. Bobby Ball naming returned for the 1976–1978 editions, the last of which was title sponsored by Miller High Life. Miller's sponsorship continued through the 1983 edition. The race then had three different title sponsors for its final three editions: Stroh's, Dana, and Circle K.

Over the entire history of the race, A. J. Foyt and Al Unser each won four times, the most of any driver. Foyt's wins came in 1960 at the Fairgrounds and then in 1965, 1971, and 1975 at the Raceway. Unser's wins all came at the Raceway, in 1969, 1976, 1979, and 1985. The most consecutive wins was three, by Tom Sneva in 1980, 1981, and 1982. Sneva's three wins were the most by any driver during the IndyCar era of the race (1979–1986).

Arizona State Fairgrounds

1954: Final 65 laps completed on November 8 due to heavy dust and the rough condition of the track.
1955: Race shortened due to rough track conditions. Driver Jack McGrath was killed in an accident during this race.
1961: Race shortened due to darkness.
1962: Race shortened due to crash.
Bolded driver indicates this was their first USAC Championship Car win

Phoenix International Raceway

  = Firestone
  = Goodyear
 Bolded driver indicates this was the drivers first IndyCar win.

Support races

Selected race summaries
1980: Johnny Rutherford led the first 37 laps, then on lap 71 was chasing leader Tom Sneva. Dicing through slower traffic, Rutherford slipped by Sneva in turn three to take the lead. He then suffered a spectacular crash. Coming out of turn four, he touched wheels with Dennis Firestone and spun into the outside wall. Then the car flipped up in the air and landed upside-down on its roll bar. Rutherford escaped with a concussion and only minor cuts and lacerations.
1985: In the second-to-last race of the season at Phoenix, Al Unser Sr. and Al Unser Jr. finished first-second, and ended the day within three points of each other going into the season finale. The father and son battle for the 1985 championship is famous in Indy car lore.

References

External links
 Champ Car Stats: Fairgrounds archive, PIR archive, Indy Lights archive
 Ultimate Racing History: Fairgrounds archive, Phoenix archive

Champ Car races
Motorsport in Arizona
Sports in Phoenix, Arizona
Recurring sporting events established in 1964
Recurring sporting events disestablished in 1986
1964 establishments in Arizona
1986 disestablishments in Arizona